Victoria Infirmary is a small hospital located in the town of Northwich, Cheshire, England. It is managed by the Mid Cheshire Hospitals NHS Foundation Trust.

History
The Infirmary originally opened in 1887 when a local MP, Robert Verdin, donated the building for use as a hospital. Extensions included a new wing in 1902, a children's ward in 1924 and further additions in the 1930s. After joining the National Health Service in 1948, it became the Victoria Infirmary and Clinic in 1950 and reverted to the Victoria Infirmary in 1975.

Services
The hospital benefits from dedicated support services, a Minor Injuries Unit (open between 9am and 10pm), a Therapy Services department and many outpatient services.

See also

Listed buildings in Northwich

References

External links 
 Official site

NHS hospitals in England
Infirmary
Hospitals in Cheshire